Subrahmanyam Karuturi is an Indian consultant physician, diabetologist, and research scholar born in 1981 specialising in diabetes and internal medicine. He currently serves as chief physician at Kify Hospital, Rajahmundry, India. He is also the founder of Kify Hospital.

Education 
Subrahmanyam obtained his graduate medical education (MBBS) at Guntur Medical College (Guntur, India). Later he did his MD from JSS Medical College in Mysore, Karnataka.

Research and career 
Subrahmanyam's research interests and specialties include Infectious Diseases, Diabetes, Internal Medicine & Blood Diseases.

Awards and honors 

 Fellow, Royal College of Physicians, London.
 Fellow, Royal College of Physicians and Surgeons of Glasgow, UK
 Fellow, American College of Physicians, USA.
 He is also a member of American College of Physicians.
 He is also a member of American Diabetes Association.
 Member of European Association for the Study of Diabetes

Selected publications 

 HIV infection and thromboembolism.

References 

Living people
Fellows of the Royal College of Physicians
Fellows of the Royal College of Surgeons of Edinburgh
Year of birth missing (living people)